Nadimuddin (born 30 August 1990) is a Bangladeshi first-class cricketer who played for Chittagong Division.

References

Living people
1990 births
Bangladeshi cricketers
Chittagong Division cricketers
People from Narayanganj District